Edmond de Stoutz (18 December 1920 – 28 January 1997) was a Swiss conductor from Zurich.

He was the founder of the Zürcher Kammerorchester (Zurich Chamber Orchestra) in 1945 and conducted the ensemble until 1996. As conductor he performed all across the world, including New York's prestigious Carnegie Hall.

Selected recordings
Johann Sebastian Bach: Concerto No. 1 in C minor for two pianos, BWV 1060
Joseph Haydn: Concerto No.11, Concerto No. 4 in G major, Arturo Benedetti Michelangeli, EMI 1975
Wolfgang Amadeus Mozart: Violin Concerto No. 2 in D major, K. 211
Peter Mieg: Concerto for oboe and strings, Igor Stravinsky: Concerto in D for string orchestra, Concerto in E-flat (Dumbarton Oaks) for 15 instruments
Mozart: Bassoon Concerto, K. 191; Clarinet Concerto, K. 622
20th century masterpieces of the Vienna school
Giuseppe Tartini: Concerto in G major (D 75), Concerto in A major (D 95), Concerto in D major (D 30)
Othmar Schoeck: Concerto (quasi una fantasia) in B flat major, op. 21, for violin and orchestra; Concerto, op. 65, for horn and string orchestra

References

External links

Edmond de Stoutz recordings at arkivmusic.com
Edmond de Stoutz reviews at classicstoday.com
Interview with Edmond de Stoutz, October 24, 1987

Swiss conductors (music)
Male conductors (music)
1920 births
1997 deaths
Musicians from Zürich
20th-century conductors (music)
20th-century male musicians